Rebeka Mikulášiková (born July 31, 1999) is a Slovak basketball player for Piešťanské Čajky and the Slovak national team. As of December 2022, Mikulášiková plays for the Ohio State Buckeyes women's basketball team.

Basketball career 
In 2013 at the age of 14, Mikulášiková started her career in the youth division in the Slovak extra league in her native Nitra. In 2016, she transferred to the Piešťanské Čajky team, where she played three seasons and was ranked among the top 10 best players in the club's history. In 2017, she won the Slovak Cup with the team.

Mikulášiková participated at the EuroBasket Women 2017. In 2018, she missed playing with the Slovak national team at the Under-20 Women's European Basketball Championship in Sopron due a knee injury.

References

1999 births
Living people
Slovak women's basketball players
Sportspeople from Nitra
Centers (basketball)
Ohio State Buckeyes women's basketball players